Sainte-Barbe-sur-Gaillon (literally Sainte-Barbe on Gaillon) is a former commune in the Eure department and Normandy region of France. On 1 January 2016, it was merged into the new commune of Le Val-d'Hazey.

Population

See also
Communes of the Eure department

References

Former communes of Eure